The Gaon Digital Chart of Gaon Music Chart is a chart that ranks the best-performing songs in South Korea. The data is collected by the Korea Music Content Association (KMCA) and ranks songs according to their performance on the Gaon Download, Streaming and BGM charts. Below is a list of songs that topped the weekly and monthly charts. The actual overall best-performing song on the chart of 2011, T-ara's "Roly-Poly", did not top any weekly or monthly chart—becoming the first (and, so far, only) time this feat has happened in the chart's history.

Weekly charts

Monthly charts

References

External links
 Gaon Digital Chart - Official Website 

2011 singles
Korea, South singles
2011 in South Korean music